In mathematics, Geronimus polynomials may refer to one of the several different families of  orthogonal polynomials studied by Yakov Lazarevich Geronimus.

References

Orthogonal polynomials